In enzymology, a 2'-hydroxydaidzein reductase is an enzyme that catalyzes the chemical reaction

2'-hydroxy-2,3-dihydrodaidzein + NADP+  2'-hydroxydaidzein + NADPH + H+

Thus, the two substrates of this enzyme are 2'-hydroxy-2,3-dihydrodaidzein and NADP+, whereas its 3 products are 2'-hydroxydaidzein, NADPH, and H+.

This enzyme belongs to the family of oxidoreductases, specifically those acting on the CH-CH group of donor with NAD+ or NADP+ as acceptor.  The systematic name of this enzyme class is 2'-hydroxy-2,3-dihydrodaidzein:NADP+ 2'-oxidoreductase. Other names in common use include NADPH:2'-hydroxydaidzein oxidoreductase, HDR, and 2'-hydroxydihydrodaidzein:NADP+ 2'-oxidoreductase.  This enzyme participates in isoflavonoid biosynthesis.

References 

 

EC 1.3.1
NADPH-dependent enzymes
Enzymes of unknown structure
Isoflavonoids metabolism